Goran Žižak (born 30 August 1968), better known as DJ Krmak, is a Bosnian turbo-folk musician.

Biography 
Žižak began making music in childhood, when he started performing at the nearby motels. Upon completing his military service, he came back to music. His songs are mostly related to current life topics.

Discography 
Коckari (1999)
Šumaher (2000)
Bo San Remo (2001)
Hollywood (2003)
Meksikanac (2004)
Vanzemljaci (2006)
Doktore (2007)
Klasična armija (2007)
Tu Tu (2008)
Bez konkurencije (2010)
Doživotna robija (2012)
Mehanicar (2019)
Karantena (2020)

See also
Music of Bosnia and Herzegovina
Turbo-folk

References

DJ Krmak biography

External links 
Official site

1968 births
Living people
Musicians from Banja Luka
21st-century Bosnia and Herzegovina male singers
Bosnia and Herzegovina turbo-folk singers
20th-century Bosnia and Herzegovina male singers